Neil Whatmore (born 17 May 1955) is an English former footballer who played as a striker. He made 449 appearances in the Football League and scored 150 goals, playing for Bolton Wanderers, Birmingham City, Oxford United, Burnley and Mansfield Town. He is perhaps best known for his four separate spells at Bolton Wanderers in the 1980s.

Career
Whatmore was born in Ellesmere Port, Cheshire. He was educated at The Whitby High School, Ellesmere Port; where he was spotted by a Bolton scout, together with Paul Jones and Barry Siddall. He made his debut for Bolton in what was then the Football League Third Division as an amateur, after coming through the club's youth system. He scored twice in this game, an away game at Swansea City. Bolton secured the divisional title that year and he scored thirty one goals four years later in promotion to the First Division. 
On promotion to the top division, Bolton's first choice forward line became Alan Gowling and Frank Worthington and Whatmore played in midfield for a season before being pushed forward again, scoring eighteen goals although Bolton were relegated.
 
Birmingham City signed him for £350,000 to reunite him with Worthington, but the pair failed to gel, and Whatmore played only rarely. When Ron Saunders took over as manager, both players fell from favour, but Whatmore stayed another year, some of which he spent on loan at Oxford United and for three months at Bolton, before being sold to Oxford United. The emergence of John Aldridge meant Whatmore was surplus to requirements after a season and, after a second loan spell at Bolton, he joined Burnley in a part-exchange deal with Billy Hamilton before moving on to Mansfield Town a few months later. At Mansfield he helped them win the 1986–87 Associate Members' Cup, playing in the final. When he was released after two-and-a-half years he spent his fourth and final spell at Burnden Park, an anonymous fan coming up with his wages, but he did not make the team and re-signed for Mansfield Town on a non-contract basis as reserve team coach and occasional player. In 1988, he moved into non-league football with Worksop Town, and later coached in South Africa.

References

External links

1955 births
Living people
People from Ellesmere Port
Sportspeople from Cheshire
English footballers
Association football forwards
Bolton Wanderers F.C. players
Birmingham City F.C. players
Oxford United F.C. players
Burnley F.C. players
Mansfield Town F.C. players
Worksop Town F.C. players
Eastwood Town F.C. players
English Football League players